Odontocyclas is a monotypic genus of gastropods belonging to the family Odontocycladidae. The only species is  Odontocyclas kokeilii.

The species is found in the Balkans.

References

Stylommatophora
Gastropod genera